The men's hammer throw event at the 1999 Pan American Games was held on July 27.

Results

References

Athletics at the 1999 Pan American Games
1999